Jocelin Behiratche (born 8 May 2000) is an Ivorian professional footballer who plays as a centre-back for Albanian club  Tirana.

Honours

Club 
Tirana
Kategoria Superiore: 2021–22
Albanian Supercup: 2022

References

2000 births
Living people
Ivorian footballers
Association football defenders
Serie D players
Serie C players
Virtus Verona players
KF Tirana players
Kategoria Superiore players
Ivorian expatriate footballers
Ivorian expatriates in Albania
Expatriate footballers in Albania